The 2022 Memphis Tigers football team represented the University of Memphis in the 2022 NCAA Division I FBS football season. The Tigers played their home games at Liberty Bowl Memorial Stadium in Memphis, Tennessee, and competed in the American Athletic Conference (The American). They were led by third-year head coach Ryan Silverfield.

Schedule
Memphis and The American announced the 2022 football schedule on February 17, 2022.

Game summaries

at Mississippi State

at Navy

vs Arkansas State

vs North Texas

vs Temple

vs Houston

at East Carolina

at No. 25 Tulane

vs No. 25 UCF

vs Tulsa

vs North Alabama

at SMU

References

Memphis
Memphis Tigers football seasons
First Responder Bowl champion seasons
Memphis Tigers football